Devaki Jain (born 1933) is an Indian economist and writer, who has worked mainly in the field of feminist economics. In 2006 she was awarded the Padma Bhushan, the third-highest civilian award from Government of India, for her contribution to social justice and the empowerment of women.

Early life 
Jain was born in Mysore, the daughter of M. A. Sreenivasan, a minister in the Princely State of Mysore and was also Dewan of Gwalior.

Education 
Jain studied at various convent schools in India. Having graduated from Mysore University in 1953 with three gold medals for the first rank
in Mathematics, English, and Overall Performance she later  attended St Anne's College, Oxford. Having graduated from Oxford with a degree in Philosophy, Politics, and Economics, she then taught economics at Delhi University until 1969.

United Nations and international networking 

Through working on her book, Women in India, she involved herself in feminist issues. She took an active part in writing, lecturing, networking, building, leading, and supporting women.

Jain was founder of the Institute of Social Studies Trust (ISST) in New Delhi and served as director until 1994. She has also worked in the field of women's employment and edited the book Indian Women for India's International Women's Year.

Gandhian philosophy has influenced Jain's work and life. In line with this philosophy, her academic research has focused on issues of equity, democratic decentralization, people-centered development, and women's rights. She has worked for local, national, and international women's movements. She currently lives in Bangalore, India.

Jain has traveled extensively as a participant in many networks and forums. As Chair of the Advisory Committee on Gender for the United Nations Centre in Asia-Pacific, she has visited numerous countries, including most Pacific and Caribbean Island. In Africa, she has visited Mozambique, Tanzania, Kenya, Nigeria, Benin and Senegal, Liberia, Cote D’Ivoir, South Africa and Botswana. Along with Julius Nyerere, she had the privilege of meeting with and discussing the visions and concerns of African leaders. She is also a member of the erstwhile South Commission founded by Nyerere.

She was a member of the Advisory Panel set up by the United Nations Development Programme (UNDP) to advise on the preparation of the 1997 Human Development Report on Poverty and for the 2002 Report on Governance. She was a member of the Eminent Persons Group of the Graça Machel Study Group appointed by the UN to study the Impact of Armed Conflict on Children.

In Women, Development, and the UN—A Sixty-Year Quest for Equality and Justice she shows how women's contributions have changed and shaped developments and practices at the UN. She introduces the term "feminization of poverty" from the feminist economist point of view. "‘Feminization of poverty,’" Jain explains, "was used to describe three distinct elements: that women have a higher incidence of poverty than men, that women’s poverty is more severe than that of men, that a trend toward greater poverty among women is associated with rising rates of female-headed households."(Jain 2005) According to her, "feminization of work" connotes low-quality, lowly-paid work. Jain argues that "feminization" devalues the increased presence of women.

Academic life 

Devaki Jain was awarded a fellowship to the Scandinavian Institute for Asian Studies Copenhagen, in the year 1983 to lecture in 9 Universities in the Region on Gender & Poverty. She was awarded an Honorary Doctorate (1999) from the University of Durban-Westville, Republic of South Africa. She also received the Bradford Morse Memorial Award (1995) from the UNDP at the Beijing World Conference. She was a visiting Fellow at the Institute of Development Studies, University of Sussex (1993) and a Fulbright Senior Fellow affiliated both with Harvard University and Boston University (1984). She was also a Fellow at the Government of Karnataka's State Planning Board, a member of the UGC's Standing Committee on Women's Studies, and a member of the South Commission, when chaired by Julius Nyerere. In the academic year 2013–14, she was Plumer Visiting Fellow at her alma mater, St Anne's College, Oxford.

Personal life 
She was married to the Gandhian economist Lakshmi Chand Jain from 1966 until his death in 2010. She has two children, including Sreenivasan Jain, the ex managing editor of NDTV.

Selected bibliography

Books 
 
 
 
 
 
 
 
 
Jain, Devaki (September 2018). Close Encounters of Another Kind . Women and Development Economics. SAGE Publisher India.  
Jain, Devaki (19 March 2018). The Journey of a Southern Feminist. SAGE Publisher India.  
Jain, Devaki (October 2020). The Brass Notebook: A Memoir. Speaking Tiger.

Book chapters

Journal articles

Papers 
  Cited here: page 133, ref. 29.
  Link.
  Link.

Lectures 
 Nuancing globalisation or Mainstreaming the downstream or Reforming Reform – Nita Barrow Memorial Lecture, University of West Indies, Barbados, November 1999
 Development as if Women Mattered - Can Women Build a new Paradigm? OECD, Paris, 1983
 Indian Women; Today and Tomorrow, Padmaja Naidu Memorial Lecture,  Published by Nehru Memorial Museum and Library, New Delhi, 1982
 Gender-apartheid as a hindrance to development: Women and the Global Economy, A public conference convened by Alliance Sud and the Swiss Agency for Development and Cooperation (SDC) 15 November 2005, Berne (Switzerland)
 Women’s Rights between the UN Human Rights Regime and Free Trade Agreements, Globalising Women's Rights: Confronting unequal development between the, UN rights framework and WTO-trade agreements, Bonn, 19–22 May 2004
 Are We Knowledge Proof? Development as Waste speech delivered at Lovraj Kumar Memorial Lecture, 26 September, New Delhi (Reprinted in Wastelands News, Vol. 19(1), August–October 2003, "Society for Promotion of Wastelands Development", New Delhi, pp. 19–30
 Through the looking glass of poverty, Paper presented at New Hall Cambridge, United kingdom, 19 October 2001.
 Valuing Women- Signals From The Ground (Broad Theme: Cultural Diversity And Universal Norms) Opening Session: 1 June 2001, For The University Of Maryland, USA
 The Torture of Women: Some Dimensions, paper presented at VII International Symposium on Torture, September 1999, New

Other 
She contributed the piece "A condition across caste and class" to the 1984 anthology Sisterhood Is Global: The International Women's Movement Anthology, edited by Robin Morgan.

See also 
 Feminist economics
 List of feminist economists

References

Further reading 
The needs of the poor come first.Interview with Devaki Jain by Monte Leach. In: Share International, Issue March 1998 online

External links 

The Devaki Jain Website (with a comprehensive bibliography)
The Website of the Casablanca Dreamers 
 Home page International Association for Feminist Economics (IAFFE)
Home page Feminist Economics journal

Indian women economists
Feminist economists
Recipients of the Padma Bhushan in social work
1933 births
Living people
20th-century Indian economists
Indian feminists
Scientists from Mysore
Boston University faculty
Harvard University staff
Businesswomen from Karnataka
Writers from Mysore
Businesspeople from Mysore
Social workers
Indian women political writers
Indian political writers
21st-century Indian women writers
20th-century Indian educators
20th-century Indian businesswomen
20th-century Indian businesspeople
20th-century Indian women scientists
20th-century Indian women writers
21st-century Indian businesswomen
21st-century Indian businesspeople
21st-century Indian women scientists
Women writers from Karnataka
Women scientists from Karnataka
20th-century Indian non-fiction writers
21st-century Indian non-fiction writers
21st-century Indian economists
Scholars from Mysore
Women educators from Karnataka
Educators from Karnataka
20th-century women educators